John Briggs Hayes (30 August 192417 January 2001) was an admiral of the United States Coast Guard who served as the 16th commandant from 1978 to 1982.

Early life and education
Hayes was born in Jamestown, New York, and grew up in Bradford, Pennsylvania. Hayes graduated from the United States Coast Guard Academy in New London, Connecticut in 1946, although Academy records list him in the Class of 1947. His first command assignment was at the LORAN Transmitting Station in Matsumae, Hokkaidō, Japan. After a series of Coast Guard cutter command assignments, he attended the Naval War College in Newport, Rhode Island.  Following graduation from the Naval War College, he was stationed in Washington, D.C., where he graduated from George Washington University's Elliott School of International Affairs, earning an M.A. in international affairs.

Career
From 1966 to 1968, Hayes assumed a command post, stationed in Vietnam, during the war. Returning to Washington, he was promoted to captain and assigned to the U.S. Coast Guard's Office of Boating Safety, followed by his service as Commandant of cadets at the United States Coast Guard Academy. From 1975 until his appointment as Coast Guard Commandant, he served as commander of the Juneau, Alaska-based 17th Coast Guard District.

Under Hayes' leadership, the Coast Guard accomplished a number of firsts for women in the military, including the assignment of Lieutenant (junior grade) Beverly Kelley as the first female commanding officer of a U.S. military vessel, and Lieutenant Kay Hartzell as the first female to command an isolated U.S. military unit.

Dates of rank

Later life and death
Following his retirement from the Coast Guard, Hayes moved to Boothbay, Maine. He died while vacationing in the Florida Keys after being struck by a car at the age of 76. He is buried in Arlington National Cemetery.

Personal life
Hayes was an Eagle Scout and a recipient of the Distinguished Eagle Scout Award.

References

External links

1924 births
2001 deaths
Commandants of the United States Coast Guard
United States Coast Guard admirals
Recipients of the Legion of Merit
Recipients of the Coast Guard Distinguished Service Medal
United States Coast Guard Academy alumni
Elliott School of International Affairs alumni
Naval War College alumni
United States Coast Guard personnel of the Vietnam War
People from Jamestown, New York
People from Bradford, Pennsylvania
People from Boothbay, Maine
Burials at Arlington National Cemetery